Khambatta is an Indian Parsi toponymic surname from Khambhat (also Khambat or Cambay). Notable people with the surname include:

Keki Khambatta (1910–?), Indian cricketer
Persis Khambatta (1948–1998), Indian model, actress and author
Piruz Khambatta, owner of Rasna

Indian surnames
Toponymic surnames
Gujarati-language surnames
People from Anand district
Parsi people
Gulf of Khambhat